Neocatapyrenium disparatum is a species of squamulose lichen in the family Verrucariaceae. Found in the United States, the lichen was described as a new species in 2005 by Othmar Breuss. It is the only member of genus Neocatapyrenium that occurs outside of Eurasia. It is only known to occur at the type locality. The specific epithet disparatum, meaning "separated", alludes to its similarity with and separation from the lookalike species Neocatapyrenium cladonioideum.

References

Verrucariales
Lichen species
Lichens described in 2005
Lichens of the South-Central United States
Fungi without expected TNC conservation status